Tverdokhlib is a Ukrainian surname. Notable people with the surname include: 

Marharyta Tverdokhlib
Oleh Tverdokhlib
Sydir Tverdokhlib
Yehor Tverdokhlib

Ukrainian-language surnames